Abalkin (masculine) or Abalkina (feminine) is a Russian surname. It derives from the Pskov regional dialectal word "" or "", meaning a bale, a bundle, or, by analogy, a swaddled child.

People with this last name
Leonid Abalkin (1930–2011), Soviet/Russian economist

Fictional characters
Lev Abalkin, a character in Arkady and Boris Strugatsky's series of science fiction novels set in the Noon Universe

References

Notes

Sources
Ю. А. Федосюк (Yu. A. Fedosyuk). "Русские фамилии: популярный этимологический словарь" (Russian Last Names: a Popular Etymological Dictionary). Москва, 2006. 

Russian-language surnames
